Ink tags are a form of retail loss prevention most commonly used by clothing retailers.  Special equipment is required to remove the tags from the clothing.  When the tags are forcibly removed, one or more glass vials containing permanent ink will break, causing it to spill over the clothing, effectively destroying it.  Ink tags fall into the loss prevention category called benefit denial.  As the name suggests, an ink tag denies the shoplifter any benefit for his or her efforts. Despite this, shoplifters have found ways around them. Ink tags are most effective if used together with another anti-shoplifting system so that the shoplifter can not use the product or remove the ink tag.

See also
 Dye pack

References

Theft
Security technology